Charles Kean O'Hara  (1860–7 August 1947) was a land owner and member of a distinguished family in Ireland. He served as the last Lord Lieutenant of Sligo and Custos Rotulorum from 1902 to 1922. He undertook the role of High Sheriff for County Sligo in 1886.

O'Hara was born in 1860, the son of Charles William O'Hara, M.P. for the county constituency. He served in the army with rank of major in 3rd Battalion Yorkshire and Lancaster Regiment. He did stand for election in Sligo County as an independent in 1883. He was appointed an Officer of the Order of the British Empire in 1920.

O'Hara was a farmer, land owner and polo player for Sligo; he was president of the Co. Sligo Agricultural Show Society and an animal exhibitor. He died at the family property, Annaghmore, Collooney, Co. Sligo, on 7 August 1947.

References

External links
 

1860 births
1947 deaths
20th-century Irish landowners
Lord-Lieutenants of Sligo
Officers of the Order of the British Empire
Irish polo players